Chintakayala Ravi is a 2008 Telugu-language romantic comedy film produced by Nallamalupu Bujji and directed by Yogi.  The cross over cinema, starring Venkatesh, Anushka Shetty, Mamta Mohandas in lead roles and Venu Thottempudi in a supporting role, with songs composed by Vishal–Shekhar and background score composed by Mani Sharma. The film received positive reviews from critics and audience. It was a hit at the box office.

Plot 
Chintakayala Ravi (Venkatesh) works in a bar named Cyber Wave in New York. He is the head waiter; he works with his three friends who also are waiters at the same bar. He has a soft spot for software engineers because he came to the US with the dream of becoming a software pro. However, unavoidable circumstances prevented him from reaching that goal.

His mother Seshamamba (Lakshmi) tells everybody in her village in Andhra Pradesh that her son is an outstanding software engineer in America. Ravi is hit hard with a sentiment; for the sole reason of not wanting to hurt his mother's feelings, he continues to tell her the sweet lie that he truly is a software engineer in America.

However, problems arise when Seshamamba gets ready to marry her son to Lavanya (Mamta Mohandas), a local village girl because Lavanya believes Seshamamba when she says that Ravi is a software engineer. So, when Lavanya asks her childhood buddy, Sunitha (Anushka), to enquire about Ravi, the truth comes out that he's a bar waiter. Her family gets angry on knowing that Ravi's family lied to them, and when Ravi arrives in the village for betrothal, he is subjected to humiliation. What happens later forms the remaining story.

He troubles Sunitha because she had got her information wrong about Ravi. Later, she understood how good a person Ravi is when he saves her father. Throughout the movie, Ravi and Sunitha become good friends and Ravi plans to find a guy for Sunitha to marry. She aims to rejoin Ravi & Lavanya, but it doesn't work out. Ravi had saved Srikanth's (Venu Thottempudi) life while he was in America. Srikanth comes to Lavanya's home and tries to convince her parents, explaining how good a person Ravi is. As Srikanth joins hands with Lavanya's parents about Ravi's marriage with Lavanya, Ravi and Sunitha fall in love with each other, which isn't known until the time of Ravi's marriage with Lavanya. On knowing the truth, Ravi's family ends up getting him married to Sunitha.

Cast 

 Venkatesh as Chintakayala Ravi
 Anushka Shetty as Sunitha
 Mamta Mohandas as Mavidikayala Lavanya
 Lakshmi as Chintakayala Seshamamba
 Shayaji Shinde as Mavidikayala Ramachandra Rao
 Chandra Mohan as Chintakayala Govinda Rao
 Brahmanandam as Pinky
 Sunil as Pendurthi Babu
 Ali as Nachimi
 Dharmavarapu Subramanyam as Venky Doors / Duwaram Venteswarulu
 M. S. Narayana as Anjineyalu
 Venu Madhav as Sai
 Chalapathi Rao as Sunitha's father
 Raghu Babu as Krishna Reddy
 Ajay as Ajay
 Ravi Prakash as Karthik
 Srinivasa Reddy as Giri
 Satyam Rajesh as Devudu
 Bandla Ganesh as Bhaskar
 Venu Thottempudi as Srikanth
 Nikita Thukral as Pooja / Poo
 Master Bharat Kumar as Bharath, Anjineyalu's son
 Pragathi as Lavanya's mother
 Pradeep Shakthi as Lavanya's uncle
 Samir Kochhar in a cameo appearance
 Rajendra as Sarath
 Srilalitha as Srivalli
 Rajitha
 Anitha Nath
 Vijaya Madhavi
 Prakash Raj as Narrator
 Rajiv Kanakala as Sunitha's to-be groom (cameo)
 Aarti Chhabria as item number
 NTR Jr. guest appearance in song "Shava Shava Bhalle Bhalle"

Soundtrack 

Music was composed by Vishal–Shekhar. Lyrics written by Chandrabose. Music released on Aditya Music.

Reception 
Radhika Rajmani of Rediff.com called it a "proper commercial family entertainer" and praised Venkatesh's performance.

Awards and nominations 
Filmfare Awards South
Nominations
 Best Music Director – Telugu – Vishal–Shekhar
 Best Female Playback Singer – Telugu – Shreya Ghoshal – "Merupulaa"
 Best Lyricist – Telugu – Chandrabose – "Enduko"

References

External links 
 

2000s Telugu-language films
2008 films
Indian films set in New York City
Films shot in India
Films shot in New York City
Indian romantic comedy films
Films about women in the Indian diaspora
Films set in St. Louis
Lists of films shot in the United States
2008 romantic comedy films